Mohamed Kourouma (born 4 August 1990) is a Guinean professional footballer who plays as a forward.

Club career

Early career
Kourouma was born in Conakry, Guinea and grew up in Montreal, Canada. In 2009, Kourouma left his youth club in Canada, Concordia Stingers, to sign with French CFA side Red Star 93. After a year in France, Kourouma joined the reserve side of Belgian First Division A club Gent. After leaving Gent, he returned to Guinea to play for Guinean Championnat National side AS Kaloum.

Miami City
In 2016, Kourouma signed with American PDL side FC Miami City and scored nine goals in thirteen appearances that season. He returned to Miami in 2017, making another thirteen league appearances and scoring eleven goals, and made two further appearances in the playoffs that year.

HFX Wanderers
In summer 2018, Kourouma spent two weeks on trial with French Ligue 1 club Nîmes Olympique after being scouted while at Miami City. In September 2018, Kourouma participated in the Canadian Premier League Open Trials and made the final cut of 28 players in Montreal.

On 4 April 2019, Kourouma signed with Canadian Premier League side HFX Wanderers. On 28 April 2019, he made his debut for Halifax as a starter in the club's inaugural match. On 14 December 2019, the club announced that Kourouma would not be returning for the 2020 season.

Atlético Ottawa
On 10 August 2020, Kourouma signed with CPL expansion side Atlético Ottawa. He made his debut in Ottawa's inaugural match on August 15 against York9 and scored their first-ever goal, netting the opener of an eventual 2-2- draw. He went on to appear in all seven of Ottawa's matches in the shortened 2020 season. On 26 February 2021, Kourouma was released by the club.

Career statistics

References

External links
 

1990 births
Living people
Sportspeople from Conakry
Soccer players from Montreal
Black Canadian soccer players
Canadian soccer players
Guinean footballers
Association football forwards
Red Star F.C. players
AS Kaloum Star players
FC Miami City players
HFX Wanderers FC players
Atlético Ottawa players
Championnat National 2 players
Canadian Soccer League (1998–present) players
USL League Two players
Canadian Premier League players
Canadian expatriate soccer players
Canadian expatriate sportspeople in France
Canadian expatriate sportspeople in Belgium
Canadian expatriate sportspeople in the United States
Guinean expatriate footballers
Guinean expatriate sportspeople in France
Guinean expatriate sportspeople in Belgium
Guinean expatriate sportspeople in the United States
Expatriate footballers in France
Expatriate footballers in Belgium
Expatriate soccer players in the United States
Guinean emigrants to Canada
Naturalized citizens of Canada